Lytovchenko or Litovchenko is a Ukrainian surname similar to Lytvyn, Lytvynenko, Lytvynchuk all derived from the word Litvin, a resident of the Grand Duchy of Lithuania. It may refer to:

 Alexander Litovchenko (1835–1890), Ukrainian-born Russian painter
 Hennadiy Lytovchenko (born 1963), Ukrainian football coach
 Ihor Lytovchenko (born 1966), Ukrainian businessman
 Irina Litovchenko (born 1950), Soviet hurdler
 Maryna Lytovchenko (born 1991), Ukrainian para table tennis player
 Serhiy Litovchenko (footballer, born 1979), Ukrainian footballer
 Serhiy Litovchenko (footballer, born 1987), Ukrainian footballer
 Tatyana Litovchenko (born 1978), Russian swimmer
 Vyacheslav Litovchenko (born 1990), Russian ice hockey player

See also
 
 

Ukrainian-language surnames